Svitiaz is the deepest lake in Ukraine, with a maximum depth of 58.4 m. It is the second largest in the country. Svitiaz belongs to groups of Shatsk's lakes, which are located in Polissya (Volyn region) in the utmost north-western corner of Ukraine, close to the borders with Poland and Belarus. The lake is part of Shatsky National Natural Park (Shatsk Raion, Volyn Oblast). In the middle of the lake there is an island of 7 hectares in size.
The lake occupies an area of 25.2 km², the average depth is 6.9 m., the transparency of water to 8 m. The length of the lake is 9.3 km. The biggest width is 8 km. Volume of the lake is 180 mill. km³. It is also very popular.

The lake warms in the summer and its clean water and sandy bottom makes it a very popular tourism site.

External links

 http://svityaz.org.ua - Official website of like Svityaz

Lakes of Shatsk